Richard Martin Keough (born April 14, 1934) is an American former professional baseball player. He played as an outfielder in Major League Baseball for the Boston Red Sox (1956–60), Cleveland Indians (1960), Washington Senators (1961), Cincinnati Reds (1962–65), Atlanta Braves (1966) and Chicago Cubs (1966) from  through  . In 1968, he played in Japan for the Nankai Hawks of the Nippon Professional Baseball league.

Born in Oakland, California, Keough comes from a baseball family: he is the older brother of Joe Keough, a former MLB outfielder, and father of Matt Keough, a right-handed pitcher who was a 16-game-winner for Billy Martin's 1980 Oakland A's. Matt also played in Japan, making them one of the few American father-son duos to both play there.

Marty Keough was a multi-sport star at Pomona High School. He was named the CIF Southern Section football player of the year in 1951 after leading the school to its only football championship. Months later, he was awarded the Southern Section's baseball co-player of the year, sharing the honor with Bill Richardson of Citrus High School. In 1952 he was named by the LA Examiner as overall Southern California Prep "Athlete of the Year".

Keough survived more than a decade in the majors without ever winning a full-time job. Mainly a defensive replacement in the outfield, he owned a decent throwing arm and showed some power at the plate, but never hit consistently enough to earn regular playing time. He debuted with the Boston Red Sox in 1956, sharing outfield work with Ted Williams, Jim Piersall and Jackie Jensen, among others, until the 1960 midseason when he was traded to the Cleveland Indians. At the end of the season, he was selected by the new Washington Senators in the expansion draft. His most productive season came in 1961 with the Senators. He started 109 of the club's 161 games, and posted career numbers in hits (97), doubles (18), triples (9), home runs (9), runs (57), RBI (34), stolen bases (12), and games played (135). In 1962, he hit a career-high .278 for the Cincinnati Reds. He also played with the Atlanta Braves and Chicago Cubs.

In an 11-season MLB career, Keough was a .242 hitter with 434 hits, 43 home runs and 176 RBI in 841 games. He recorded a .986 fielding percentage playing at all three outfield positions and first base.

He has remained in the game as a scout since the end of his playing days, and is a longtime member of the scouting staff of the St. Louis Cardinals.

See also

List of second-generation Major League Baseball players

References

External links
, or NPB (in Japanese)
Marty Keough at SABR (Baseball BioProject)
Marty Keough at Baseball Almanac
Marty Keough at Baseball Library

1934 births
Living people
American expatriate baseball players in Japan
Atlanta Braves players
Baseball players from Oakland, California
Boston Red Sox players
Chicago Cubs players
Cincinnati Reds players
Cleveland Indians players
Los Angeles Dodgers scouts
Louisville Colonels (minor league) players
Major League Baseball outfielders
Nankai Hawks players
St. Louis Cardinals scouts
San Diego Padres scouts
San Diego Padres (minor league) players
San Francisco Seals (baseball) players
San Jose Red Sox players
Sportspeople from Pomona, California
Washington Senators (1961–1971) players